The German Pekin, is a European breed of domestic duck. It is commonly called simply Pekin or White Pekin. It is a different breed from the American Pekin, which is also commonly known by the same names. It was bred in Europe from birds originating in China and Japan and is distributed in many European countries.

History 

The mallard was probably domesticated in China before 1000 AD. Force-feeding of ducks is documented from the tenth century, under the Five Dynasties. Chinese people were sophisticated breeders of ducks. Among several breeds they created was one named shi-chin-ya-tze, or roughly "ten-pound duck".

In 1872 some birds of this type were imported to the United Kingdom by Walter Steward; others were taken to the United States by James E. Palmer, where they gave rise to the American Pekin breed. Some soon reached Germany from the UK, possibly via France.

In Germany the Chinese ducks were cross-bred with upright white ducks brought from Japan by Dutch ships, resulting in birds with a steep body angle; those taken to the United States were crossed with Aylesbury birds, which led to birds with a more horizontal stance. In Britain as in Germany, breeders in the early twentieth century tended to select for an upright body position. The modern British breed derives mostly from birds imported from Germany from about 1970.

The German Pekin is listed as "seriously endangered" in the Rote Liste of the Gesellschaft zur Erhaltung alter und gefährdeter Haustierrassen, a German national association for the conservation of historic and endangered domestic animal breeds. In the United Kingdom it is considered "vulnerable".

Characteristics 

The Pekin is heavily feathered; the plumage is creamy white with a yellowish tinge. The beak is short and orange-coloured. The body is broad and heavy, and is held almost vertical.

Use 

The Pekin was intended to be a table bird, reared for its meat. Ducks lay about 80 eggs per year; the eggs weigh approximately

References 

Duck breeds
Duck breeds originating in Germany